The Merry Wives of Vienna is a 1931 German musical comedy film directed by Géza von Bolváry and starring Willi Forst, Lee Parry, and Paul Hörbiger. It was shot at the Tempelhof Studios in Berlin. The film's sets were designed by Andrej Andrejew and Gabriel Pellon.

It is an operetta film set in pre-First World War Vienna.

Cast

References

Bibliography

External links 
 

1931 films
1931 musical comedy films
German musical comedy films
1930s German-language films
Films directed by Géza von Bolváry
Films set in Vienna
Films set in the 1900s
German black-and-white films
Films based on operettas
Operetta films
1930s historical comedy films
German historical comedy films
1930s historical musical films
German historical musical films
Films scored by Robert Stolz
Films shot at Tempelhof Studios
1930s German films